The Democratic Party of Korea held its leadership by-election on 2 May 2021 following the resignation of the incumbent Lee Nak-yon in March 2021. Lee stepped down from party leader due to party rule which bans any party contender for president from holding party position at least for a year before the presidential election.

Newly-elected leader of the party will serve for the remainder of Lee's term which ends in August 2022 and may replace two unelected members of the Supreme Council currently held by Park Seong-min and Park Hong-bae who were appointed by Lee in 2020. They will also command party's campaign in the 20th presidential election in March 2022 and the 8th local election in June 2022.

Immediately after the party's loss in 2021 South Korean by-elections, all members of its Supreme Council decided to resign. The date for its leadership by-election was also decided as 2 May to elect its new party leader as earliest as possible. Few days later, it was decided that members of the Supreme Council will be elected on the same day after party members complained about not having their votes in new members of Supreme Council.

Candidates

Candidates for leader 
 Hong Young-pyo, a member of the National Assembly from Incheon(Bupyeong B) and a former floor leader
 Song Young-gil, a member of the National Assembly from Incheon(Gyeyang B) and a former mayor of Incheon, unsuccessfully run in 2018 leadership election
 Woo Won-shik, a member of the National Assembly from Seoul(Nowon B) and a former floor leader

Eliminated 
 Chung Han-do, a member of Yongin City Council

Candidates for Supreme Council 
 Kang Byung-won, a member of the National Assembly from Seoul(Eunpyeong B)
 Hwang Myung-sun, incumbent, three-term mayor of Nonsan City
 Kim Yong-min, a member of the National Assembly from Namyangju City(Namyangju C)
 Jun Hye-sook, a member of the National Assembly from Seoul(Gwangjin A)
 Suh Sam-suk,  a member of the National Assembly from South Jeolla Province(Yeongam–Muan–Sinan) and a former three-term mayor of its Muan County
 Back Hye-ryun, a member of the National Assembly from Suwon City(Suwon B)
 Kim Young-bae, a member of the National Assembly from Seoul(Seongbuk A) and a former two-term mayor of Seoul's Seongbuk District

Results 
The ratio of the results by sector was 45% for delegates, 40% for party members, 10% for opinion poll and 5% for non-voting members poll.

References 

Minjoo Party of Korea
Political party leadership elections in South Korea
2021 in South Korea
Democratic Party of Korea leadership by-election